The following is a list of events affecting Canadian television in 1975. Events listed include television show debuts, finales, cancellations, and channel launches.

Events

Debuts

Ending this year

Television shows

1950s
Country Canada (1954–2007)
CBC News Magazine (1952–1981)
Circle 8 Ranch (1955–1978)
The Friendly Giant (1958–1985)
Hockey Night in Canada (1952–present)
The National (1954–present)
Front Page Challenge (1957–1995)
Wayne and Shuster Show (1958–1989)

1960s
CTV National News (1961–present)
Land and Sea (1964–present)
Man Alive (1967–2000)
Mr. Dressup (1967–1996)
The Nature of Things (1960–present, scientific documentary series)
The Pig and Whistle (1967–1977)
Question Period (1967–present, news program)
Reach for the Top (1961–1985)
Take 30 (1962–1983)
The Tommy Hunter Show (1965–1992)
University of the Air (1966–1983)
W-FIVE (1966–present, newsmagazine program)

1970s
The Beachcombers (1972–1990)
Canada AM (1972–present, news program)
City Lights (1973–1989)
Definition (1974–1989)
Excuse My French (1974–1976)
Headline Hunters (1972–1983)
House of Pride (1974–1976)
Howie Meeker's Hockey School (1973–1977)
Marketplace (1972–present, newsmagazine program)
Ombudsman (1974–1980)
This Is the Law (1971–1976)
This Land (1970–1982)
V.I.P. (1973–1983)

See also
 1975 in Canada
 List of Canadian films

TV movies

Television stations

Debuts

Network affiliation changes

Closures

References